

Dinosaurs
 William Buckland realizes that fossils he previously believed to be of cetacean origin were actually Iguanodon fossils. This mistake cost him the chance to describe the genus himself.

Newly named dinosaurs

Plesiosaurs

New taxa

References

1820s in paleontology
Paleontology